The United States Military Academy (USMA) is an undergraduate college in West Point, New York with the mission of educating and commissioning officers for the United States Army. The academy was founded in 1802 and is the oldest of the United States' five service academies. It is also referred to as West Point (the name of the military base that the academy is a part of). The academy graduated its first cadet, Joseph Gardner Swift, in October 1802. Sports media refer to the academy as "Army" and the students as "Cadets"; this usage is officially endorsed. The football team is also known as "The Black Knights of the Hudson" and "The Black Knights". A small number of graduates each year choose the option of cross-commissioning into the United States Air Force, United States Navy, or the United States Marine Corps. Before the founding of the United States Air Force Academy in 1955, the academy was a major source of officers for the Air Force and its predecessors. Most cadets are admitted through the congressional appointment system. The curriculum emphasizes the sciences and engineering fields.

The list is drawn from graduates, non-graduate former cadets, current cadets, and faculty of the Military Academy. Notable graduates include 2 American Presidents, 4 additional heads of state, 20 astronauts, 76 Medal of Honor recipients (more than any other service academy or undergraduate institution), 70 Rhodes Scholars, and 3 Heisman Trophy winners. Among American universities, the academy is fourth on the list of total winners for Rhodes Scholarships, seventh for Marshall Scholarships and fourth on the list of Hertz Fellowships.

Academicians 
"Class year" refers to the alumni's class year, which usually is the same year they graduated. However, in times of war, classes often graduate early. For example, there were two classes in 1943 – January 1943 and June 1943.

Academics
Note: "Class year" refers to the alumni's class year, which usually is the same year they graduated. However, in times of war, classes often graduate early.

Superintendents of the United States Military Academy

Commandants of the United States Military Academy

Top-ranking graduates

Astronauts

Businesspeople 

 Henry A. du Pont, class of 1861, President and general manager of Wilmington & Western Railroad (1879–1899)
 Robert E. Wood, class of 1900, chairman and CEO of Sears, Roebuck (1939–1954); responsible for shifting the company's focus from a mail-order catalog company to a department store retailer; started AllState Insurance as a subsidiary of Sears; served as the Quartermaster of the Army in World War I and as chief quartermaster during the construction of the Panama Canal
 William T. Seawell, class of 1941, chairman and CEO of Pan Am Airways (1971–1981)
 Robert F. McDermott, class of 1943, former chairman and CEO of United Services Automobile Association (USAA)
 John F. Donahue, class of 1946, founder and Chairman of Federated Investors ($400 billion asset management firm)
 Frank Borman, class of 1950, President of Eastern Airlines (1975–1986)
 Walter F. Ulmer, class of 1952, President and CEO of Center for Creative Leadership (1985–1994)
 Rand Araskog, class of 1953, President, chairman, and CEO of ITT Communications
 Dana G. Mead, class of 1957, chairman and CEO of Tenneco (1994–1999), Chairman of MIT Corporation (since 2003)
 Pete Dawkins, class of 1959, former chairman and CEO of Primerica Financial Services, Vice-chairman and EVP of Travelers Insurance, Vice Chairman of Bain and Company, Vice Chairman of Citi Global Wealth Management, currently Senior Partner at Flintlock Capital
 Fred Malek, class of 1959, founder and Chairman of Thayer Capital Partners, Chairman of Northwest Airlines
 Frank J. Caufield, co-founder of venture capital firm Kleiner Perkins Caufield & Byers
 Albert Dunlap, class of 1960, CEO of Scott Paper and Sunbeam
 Jim Kimsey, class of 1962, chairman and co-founder of AOL
 Daniel W. Christman, class of 1965, Superintendent of USMA, 1996–2001; Chairman of Ultralife Corporation, SVP of International Affairs for US Chamber of Commerce (since 2003)
 John B. Ritch III, class of 1965, chairman and co-founder of Calivita International (since 1992)
 William P. Foley II, class of 1967, former CEO and current Chairman of Fidelity National Information Services
 Marshall Larsen, class of 1970, chairman and CEO of Goodrich, Corporation (since 2003)
 Bob McDonald, class of 1975, CEO of Procter & Gamble
 Ken Hicks, class of 1974, President and CEO of Foot Locker, former President of JCPenney
 William Albrecht, class of 1974, President of Occidental Oil and Gas
 Vincent Viola, class of 1977, former Chairman of NYMEX (2001–2004), CEO of VirtuFinancial, owner and member of Chairman's Council of the New Jersey Nets
 Keith McLoughlin, class of 1978, President and CEO of Electrolux
 Alex Gorsky, class of 1982, CEO of Johnson & Johnson
 Mark Green, class of 1986, founder and former CEO of Align MD
 Anthony J. Guzzi, class of 1986, President and CEO of EMCOR Group, Inc., the world's largest specialty construction, facilities services, energy infrastructure provider and a Fortune 500 company
 Mark Clouse, class of 1990, President and CEO of Campbell Soup Company
 Anthony Noto, class of 1991, former CFO and COO of Twitter and current CEO of SoFi
 John Ham, class of 2000, Ustream Founder, CEO and Chairman
 Brad Hunstable, class of 2001, founder and President of Ustream.TV

Engineers

Government

Heads of state

Directors of the Central Intelligence Agency 
 Hoyt Vandenberg, class of 1923, DCI 10 June 1946 – 1 May 1947
 David Petraeus, class of 1974, DCIA 6 September 2011 – 9 November 2012
 Mike Pompeo, class of 1986, DCIA 23 January 2017 – 26 April 2018 (became United States Secretary of State)

Cabinet members 
 Andrew J. Donelson, class of 1820, President's Secretary (1829–1837)
 Jefferson Davis, class of 1828, United States Secretary of War (1853–1857)
 Montgomery Blair, class of 1835, United States Postmaster General (1861–1864)
 William Tecumseh Sherman, class of 1840, United States Secretary of War (1869)
 Gustavus Woodson Smith, class of 1842, Confederate States Secretary of War (1862)
 John Schofield, class of 1853, United States Secretary of War (1868–1869)
 Marshall Carter, class of 1931, Deputy Director of Central Intelligence (1962–1965) and Director of the National Security Agency (1965–1969)
 Rafael M. Ileto, class of 1943, Philippine Secretary of National Defense (1986–1988)
 Brent Scowcroft, class of 1947, National Security Advisor (1974–1977, 1989–1993)
 Alexander Haig, class of 1947, United States Secretary of State (1981–1982)
 Fidel V. Ramos, class of 1950, Philippines Secretary of National Defense (1988–1991)
 John Block, class of 1957, United States Secretary of Agriculture (1981–1986)
 Jim Nicholson, class of 1961, United States Secretary of Veterans Affairs (2005–2007)
 Barry McCaffrey, class of 1964, US Drug Czar (1996–2001)
 Eric K. Shinseki, class of 1965, United States Secretary of Veterans Affairs (2009–2014)
 James Peake, class of 1966, United States Secretary of Veterans Affairs (2007–2009)
 Robert Alan McDonald, class of 1975, United States Secretary of Veterans Affairs (2014–2017)
 Mike Pompeo, class of 1986, United States Secretary of State (2018–2021), former Director of the Central Intelligence Agency (2017–2018)
 Mark Esper, class of 1986, 27th United States Secretary of Defense (2019–2020), former 23rd United States Secretary of the Army (2017–2019)
 Lloyd Austin, class of 1975, 28th United States Secretary of Defense (2021–present)

Ambassadors 

 Andrew J. Donelson, class of 1820, Chargé d'affaires of the United States to the Republic of Texas (1845), U.S. Minister to Prussia (1846–49), U.S. vice presidential candidate (1856)
 Rufus King, class of 1833, U.S. Minister to the Papal States (1863–1867)
 William Woods Averell, class of 1855, U.S. Consul General to British North America (1866–1869)
 Hugh Judson Kilpatrick, class of 1856, U.S. Minister to Chile, 1866–70, 1881
 Frederick Dent Grant, class of 1871, U.S. Minister to Austro-Hungarian Empire (1890–1893)
 James Maurice Gavin, class of 1929, U.S. Ambassador to France (1961–62)
 John Eisenhower, class of 1944, U.S. Ambassador to Belgium (1969–1971)
 David Manker Abshire, class of 1951, U.S. Ambassador to NATO (1983–1987)
 John Galvin, class of 1954, U.S. Ambassador to Bosnian Peace Negotiations
 Jim Nicholson, class of 1961, U.S. Ambassador to the Vatican (2001–2005)
 John B. Ritch III, class of 1965, U.S. Ambassador to United Nations International Organizations in Vienna (1993–2001)
 Robert M. Kimmitt, class of 1969, U.S. Ambassador to Germany (1991–1993)
 William B. Taylor Jr., class of 1969, U.S. Ambassador to Ukraine (2006–2009, 2019–2020)
 Karl Eikenberry, class of 1973, U.S. Ambassador to Afghanistan (2009–2011)
 Matthew Klimow, class of 1974, U.S. Ambassador to Turkmenistan (2019–present), acting State Department Inspector General (2020)

Governors (civil) 

 Robert Francis Withers Allston, class of 1821, Governor of South Carolina (1856–58)
 David Wallace, class of 1821, Governor of Indiana (1837–1840)
 Robert Milligan McLane, class of 1837, Governor of Maryland (1884–85)
 Isaac Ingalls Stevens, class of 1839, Governor of Washington Territory (1853–1857)
 George Stoneman, class of 1846, Governor of California (1883–1887)
 George B. McClellan, class of 1846, Governor of New Jersey (1878–81)
 Ambrose Burnside, class of 1847, Governor of Rhode Island (1866–69)
 Francis Redding Tillou Nicholls, class of 1855, Governor of Louisiana (1877–80, 88–92)
 William H. Upham, class of 1866, Governor of Wisconsin (1895–1897)
 Alexander Oswald Brodie, class of 1870, Governor of Arizona Territory (1902–05)
 Charles H. Martin, class of 1887, Governor of Oregon (1935–39)
 Chester Harding, class of 1889, Governor of Panama Canal Zone (1917–21)
 Jay Johnson Morrow, class of 1891, Governor of Panama Canal Zone (1921–24)
 Meriwether L. Walker, class of 1893, Governor of Panama Canal Zone (1924–28)
 Harry Burgess, class of 1895, Governor of Panama Canal Zone (1928–32)
 Clarence S. Ridley, class of 1905, Governor of Panama Canal Zone (1936–40)
 Glen E. Edgerton, class of 1908, Governor of Panama Canal Zone (1940–44)
 Joseph C. Mehaffey, class of 1911, Governor of Panama Canal Zone (1944–48)
 Francis K. Newcomer, class of 1913, Governor of Panama Canal Zone (1948–52)
 John S. Seybold, class of 1920, Governor of Panama Canal Zone (1952–56)
 William E. Potter, class of 1933, Governor of Panama Canal Zone (1956–60)
 William A. Carter, class of 1930, Governor of Panama Canal Zone (1960–62)
 Robert John Fleming, class of 1928, Governor of Panama Canal Zone (1962–67)
 David Stuart Parker, class of 1940, Governor of Panama Canal Zone (1971–75)
 Harold Parfitt, class of 1943, Governor of Panama Canal Zone (1975–79)
 Warren E. Hearnes, class of 1946, Governor of Missouri (1965–1973)
 Dave Heineman, class of 1970, Governor of Nebraska (2005–2015)
 John Bel Edwards, class of 1988, Governor of Louisiana (2016–present)

Governors (military) 

 Thomas Childs, class of 1814, military governor of Puebla, Mexico
 John H. Martindale, class of 1835, military Governor of Washington, D.C.
 Rufus Saxton, class of 1849, military governor of the Department of the South
 Fitzhugh Lee, class of 1856, military governor of Havana, Cuba
 Philip Sheridan, class of 1853, military governor of the Fifth Military District
 Douglas MacArthur, class of 1903, military governor of Japan
 George S. Patton, class of 1909, military governor of Bavaria
 Joseph T. McNarney, class of 1915, military governor of U.S. Occupation Zone, Germany
 Matthew Ridgway, class of 1917, military governor of Japan
 Lucius D. Clay, class of 1918, military Governor in West Germany noted for Berlin Airlift

Legislators 

 Daniel Azro Ashley Buck, class of 1808, U.S. Representative (1823–1825, 1827–1829), Vermont
 Daniel Tunern, class of 1814, U.S. Representative, North Carolina (1827–1829)
 James Monroe, class of 1815, U.S. Representative (1839–1841), New York
 George Wurtz Hughes, class of 1827, U.S. Representative (1859–1861), Maryland
 Jefferson Davis, class of 1828, U.S. Representative (1845–1846) and Senator (1847–1853, elected but not seated 1875), Mississippi
 Alexander C.M. Pennington, class of 1828, represented  in the United States House of Representatives 1853–1857
 Joseph E. Johnston, class of 1829, U.S. Representative, Virginia
 Henry Bell Van Rensselaer, class of 1831, U.S. Representative, New York
 Robert Milligan McLane, class of 1837, U.S. Representative, Maryland
 John B. S. Todd, class of 1837, U.S. Congressman, Dakota Territory (1861–1863, 1864–1865)
 James Madison Leach, class of 1838, U.S. Representative, North Carolina
 Isaac Ingalls Stevens, class of 1839, U.S. Representative, Washington Territory
 Egbert Ludoricus Viele, class of 1847, U.S. Representative, New York
 Ambrose Burnside, class of 1847, U.S. Senator, Rhode Island (1875–1881)
 Henry Warner Slocum, class of 1852, U.S. Representative, New York (1869–1873, 1883–1884)
 Henry A. du Pont, class of 1861, U.S. Senator, Delaware (1895–1896, 1906–1917)
 Joseph Wheeler, class of 1859, U.S. Representative, Alabama (1881–1882, 1883, 1885–1900)
 Frank Obadiah Briggs, class of 1872, U.S. Senator, New Jersey
Jesse Matlack Baker, class of 1873, Pennsylvania State Representative (1889-1892) and State Senator (1893-1897)
 Lawrence D. Tyson, class of 1883, U.S. Senator, Tennessee (1925–1929)
 Bertram Tracy Clayton, class of 1886, U.S. Representative, New York (1899–1901)
 Charles Henry Martin, class of 1887, U.S. Representative, Oregon
 Butler Ames, class of 1894, U.S. Representative, Massachusetts
 Frank Kowalski, class of 1930, U.S. Representative from Connecticut
 Nile Soik, class of 1945, member of the Wisconsin State Legislature
 Howard Hollis Callaway, class of 1949, U.S. Representative, Georgia
 John Michael Murphy, class of 1950, U.S. Representative, New York
 Adam Benjamin Jr., class of 1958, U.S. Representative, Indiana (1977–82)
 Jack Reed, class of 1971, U.S. Representative (1991–1997), U.S. Senator (1997- ), Rhode Island
 John Shimkus, class of 1980, U.S. Representative, Illinois (1997– )
 Geoff Davis, class of 1981, U.S. Representative, Kentucky (2004– )
 Mike Pompeo, class of 1986, U.S. Representative, Kansas (2011–2017)
 Mark Green, class of 1986, U.S. Representative, Tennessee (2019– )
 Brett Guthrie, class of 1987, U.S. Representative, Kentucky (2009– )
 Warren Davidson, class of 1995, U.S. Representative, Ohio (2016– )
 Steve Watkins, class of 1999, U.S. Representative, Kansas (2018– )
 Pat Ryan, class of 2004, U.S. Representative, New York (2022– )

Mayors 

 William Lewis Cabell, class of 1850, Mayor of Dallas, Texas (1874–76, 1877–79, 1883–85)
 Frank Fischl, class of 1951, Mayor of Allentown, Pennsylvania (1978–1982)
 Robert M. Isaac, class of 1951, Mayor of Colorado Springs, Colorado (1979–1997)
 Matthew Collier, class of 1979, Mayor of Flint, Michigan (1988–1992)
 Maria Vedder Lowe, class of 1998, Mayor of St. Pete Beach, Florida (2014–2016)
 Adrian Perkins, class of 2008, Mayor of Shreveport, Louisiana (2018–Present)

Jurists 
 Rhesa Barksdale, class of 1966, U.S. Court of Appeals for the Fifth Circuit (1990– )
 Montgomery Blair, class of 1835, attorney for Dred Scott in landmark 1857 Supreme Court Case Dred Scott v. Sandford, in President Abraham Lincoln's Cabinet (1861–1864)
 Malcolm Jones Howard, class of 1962, Judge, United States District Court Eastern District of North Carolina (1987– )
 Mike Bowers, class of 1963, Georgia's longest serving Attorney General (1981–1997)
 Richard D. Cudahy, class of 1948, Judge on the United States Court of Appeals for the Seventh Circuit
 Roy Moore, class of 1969, Chief Justice Alabama Supreme Court (2001–2003, 2013–2017)
 The Honorable Eugene R. Sullivan, class of 1964, Chief Judge of the U.S. Court of Appeals (AF) (1986–2002)
 Francis Redding Tillou Nicholls, class of 1855, Chief Justice Louisiana Supreme Court (1892–1911)
 Richard Whitehead Young, class of 1882, Philippines Supreme Court Justice (1899–1901)

Law enforcement and intelligence figures 
 Fitz John Porter, class of 1845, New York City Police Commissioner
 William Farrar Smith, class of 1845, New York City Police Commissioner
 Frederick Dent Grant, class of 1871, New York City Police Commissioner
 Douglas I. McKay, class of 1905, New York City Police Commissioner
 Norman Schwarzkopf Sr., class of 1917
 Alva Revista Fitch, class of 1930
 Barry McCaffrey class of 1964, Drug Czar during Clinton Administration
 Donald B. Smith class of 1969, New York State Sheriff Association President, Putnam County Sheriff 2002–2018
 Keith B. Alexander class of 1974, Head of the National Security Agency, General – Commander of Cyber Command
 Lon Horiuchi, class of 1976

Literary figures and actors 

 Henry Martyn Robert, class of 1857, author of Robert's Rules of Order
William James Roe, class of 1867, author of satirical and metaphysical works, poet and artist
 John Wilson Ruckman, class of 1883, first editor of Journal of U.S. Artillery, author of numerous technical articles on gunnery
 Herbert H. Sargent, class of 1883, author of Napoleon Bonaparte's First Campaign, The Campaign of Marengo and The Campaign of Santiago de Cuba
 Cornelis DeWitt Willcox, class of 1885
 Col. Mark M. Boatner III, class of June 1943, author of Civil War Dictionary, Encyclopedia of the American Revolution
 Hal Moore, class of 1945, author of We Were Soldiers Once...And Young
 James Salter, class of 1945, prolific author, selected to the Academy of Arts and Letters
 Bill McWilliams, class of 1955, author of A Return To Glory
 Gus Lee, ex-class of 1966, honorary member of the class of 1970, author of China Boy, Chasing Hepburn
 Lucian Truscott IV, class of 1969, journalist and author of Dress Grey
 Brian Haig, class of 1975, novelist
 James Carafano, class of 1977, author of Winning the Long War
 Mark Valley, class of 1987, TV and movie actor
 Col. Gregory D. Gadson, class of 1989, movie actor
 Paula Broadwell, class of 1995, author

Military figures

Medal of Honor recipients

Civil War

Indian Wars

Spanish–American War

Philippine–American War

Boxer Rebellion

Mexican Campaign (Veracruz)

World War I

World War II

Korea

Vietnam

Mexican–American War combatants

American Civil War combatants

Confederate States Army generals

Union Army generals

Indian Wars combatants and Buffalo Soldiers 

 John Hanks Alexander, class of 1887
 Walker Keith Armistead, class of 1803
 John W. Barlow, class of 1861
 John T. Barnett, class of 1878
 Robert C. Buchanan, class of 1830
 Edward Canby, class of 1839
 Elias Chandler, class of 1880
 Philip St. George Cooke, class of 1827
 George Crook, class of 1852
 George Armstrong Custer, class of 1861
 John Wynn Davidson, class of 1845
 Henry Ossian Flipper, class of 1877
 James W. Forsyth, class of 1856
 Robert S. Garnett, class of 1841
 John Gibbon, class of 1847
 Oliver O. Howard, class of 1854
 Robert Lee Howze, class of 1888
 Charles King, class of 1866
 Thomas J. Lewis, class of 1875
 Gustavus Loomis, class of 1811
 Ranald S. Mackenzie, class of 1862
 Randolph B. Marcy, class of 1832
 Wesley Merritt, class of 1860
 George H. Morgan, class of 1880
 Edward Ord, class of 1839
 John J. Pershing, class of 1886
 John Pope (military officer), class of 1842
 Marcus Reno, class of 1857
 William Tecumseh Sherman, class of 1840
 Philip Sheridan, class of 1853
 Samuel D. Sturgis, class of 1846
 George Wright, class of 1822
 Charles Young, class of 1889

Spanish–American War and Philippine Insurrection combatants 

 Stanley Dunbar Embick, class of 1899
 Frederick Dent Grant, class of 1871
 William G. Haan, class of 1889
 Hamilton S. Hawkins, class of 1855
 Guy Henry, class of 1898
 Lucius Roy Holbrook, class of 1896
 Willard Ames Holbrook, class of 1885
 Robert Lee Howze, class of 1888
 Richard L. Hoxie, class of 1868
 Jacob Ford Kent, class of 1861
 Charles King, class of 1866
 Fitzhugh Lee, class of 1856
 Manus MacCloskey, class of 1898
 Wesley Merritt, class of 1860
 Eben Swift, class of 1876
 Charles Symmonds, class of 1888
 Joseph Wheeler, class of 1859
 James H. Wilson, class of 1860
 John Moulder Wilson, class of 1860

Pancho Villa Expedition combatants

World War I combatants

World War II combatants

Korean War combatants 
 
 Creighton Abrams, class of 1936, Corps Chief of Staff, Korean War. In 1980, the United States Army named its then-new main battle tank, the M1 Abrams, after him.
 Arnold W. Braswell, class of 1948
 Mark Wayne Clark, class of 1917
 J. Lawton Collins, class of 1917
 Lawrence Russell Dewey, class of 1924
 James Van Fleet, class of 1915
 Alexander Haig, class of 1947
 William M. Hoge, class of 1916
 Lyman Lemnitzer, class of 1920
 Douglas MacArthur, class of 1903
 Andrew P. O'Meara, class of 1930
 Ralph Puckett, class of 1949, Commander of 8th Army Ranger Company
 Fidel V. Ramos, class of 1950, Platoon leader of the 20th Battalion Combat Team, Philippine Expeditionary Forces to Korea
 Matthew Ridgway, class of 1917
 Davis C. Rohr, class of 1952
 Edward Rowny, class of 1941
 Maxwell D. Taylor, class of 1922
 Thomas J. H. Trapnell, class of 1927
 William H. Tunner, class of 1928
 Sam S. Walker, class of 1946
 Walton Walker, class of 1912
 Roderick Wetherill, class of 1940. later major general in the Vietnam War

Vietnam War combatants 
 Creighton Abrams, class of 1936, commanded the U.S. Army Military Assistance Command, Vietnam (1968–1972)
 Anderson W. Atkinson, class of 1946
 Peter J. Boylan, class of 1961
 Wesley Clark, class of 1966
 Harry Griffith Cramer Jr., class of 1946
 Eugene Peyton Deatrick, class of 1946
 Jack K. Farris, class of 1957
 Alexander Haig, class of 1947
 Paul D. Harkins, class of 1929
 Harold Keith Johnson, class of 1933
 Nicholas S. H. Krawciw, class of 1959
 Barry McCaffrey, class of 1964
 Montgomery Meigs, class of 1967
 Hal Moore, class of 1945, commanded 1st Battalion, 7th Cavalry Regiment in the Ia Drang Valley (1965)
 Joseph J. Nazzaro, class of 1936
 Robin Olds, class of 1943
 George Patton IV, class of 1946
 Ralph Puckett, class of 1949, Commander 2d Battalion, 502d Infantry (Airborne), 101st Airborne Division
 Fidel V. Ramos, class of 1950, Chief of Staff of the Philippine Military Contingent and Civil Action Group to Vietnam (1965–1968)
 Davis C. Rohr, class of 1952
 Hoyt S. Vandenberg Jr., class of 1951
 Sam S. Walker, class of 1946
 William Westmoreland

Gulf War combatants

War on Terror

Participants

Afghanistan combatants

Iraq combatants

Supreme Allied Commanders of NATO 
 Dwight Eisenhower, class of 1915
 Lyman Lemnitzer, class of 1922
 Andrew Goodpaster, class of 1939
 Bernard W. Rogers, class of 1943
 Alexander Haig, class of 1947
 John Galvin, class of 1954
 George Joulwan, class of 1961
 Wesley Clark, class of 1966
 Curtis M. Scaparrotti, class of 1978

Chairmen of the Joint Chiefs of Staff 
 Omar N. Bradley, class of 1915, CJCS, 1949–1953
 Nathan F. Twining, class of 1919, CJCS, 1957–1960
 Lyman L. Lemnitzer, class of 1920, CJCS, 1960–1962
 Maxwell D. Taylor, class of 1922, CJCS, 1962–1964
 Earle G. Wheeler, class of 1932, CJCS, 1964–1970
 George Scratchley Brown, U.S. Air Force, class of 1941, CJCS, 1974–1978
 Martin E. Dempsey, class of 1974, CJCS, 2011–2015

Army Chiefs of Staff/Commanders of the Army 
 George B. McClellan, class of 1846, Commanding General of the Army (1861–1862)
 Henry Wager Halleck, class of 1839, Commanding General of the Army (1862–1864)
 Ulysses S. Grant, class of 1843, Commanding General of the Army (1864–1869)
 William Tecumseh Sherman, class of 1840, Commanding General of the Army (1869–1883)
 Philip Sheridan, class of 1853, Commanding General of the Army (1883–1888)
 John Schofield, class of 1853, Commanding General of the Army (1888–1895)
 J. Franklin Bell, class of 1878, U.S. Army Chief of Staff (1906–1910)
 Hugh L. Scott, class of 1876, U.S. Army Chief of Staff (1914–1917)
 Tasker H. Bliss, class of 1875, U.S. Army Chief of Staff (1917–1918)
 Peyton C. March, class of 1888, U.S. Army Chief of Staff (1918–1921)
 John Pershing, class of 1886, U.S. Army Chief of Staff (1921–1924)
 John L. Hines, class of 1891, U.S. Army Chief of Staff (1924–1926)
 Charles Pelot Summerall, class of 1892, U.S. Army Chief of Staff (1926–1930)
 Douglas MacArthur, class of 1903, U.S. Army Chief of Staff (1930–1935)
 Malin Craig, class of 1898, U.S. Army Chief of Staff (1935–1939)
 Dwight D. Eisenhower, class of 1915, U.S. Army Chief of Staff (1945–1948)
 Omar Bradley, class of 1915, U.S. Army Chief of Staff (1948–1949)
 J. Lawton Collins, class of 1917, U.S. Army Chief of Staff (1949–1953)
 Matthew Ridgway, class of 1917, U.S. Army Chief of Staff (1953–1955)
 Maxwell D. Taylor, class of 1922, U.S. Army Chief of Staff (1955–1959)
 Lyman Lemnitzer, class of 1920, U.S. Army Chief of Staff (1959–1960)
 Earle Wheeler, class of 1932, U.S. Army Chief of Staff (1962–1964)
 Harold Keith Johnson, class of 1933, U.S. Army Chief of Staff (1964–1968)

 William Westmoreland, class of 1936, U.S. Army Chief of Staff (1968–1972)
 Bruce Palmer Jr., class of 1936, U.S. Army Chief of Staff (1972)
 Creighton Abrams, class of 1936, U.S. Army Chief of Staff (1972–1974)
 Bernard W. Rogers, class of 1943, U.S. Army Chief of Staff (1976–1979)
 Edward C. Meyer, class of 1951, U.S. Army Chief of Staff (1979–1983)
 John Wickham, class of 1950, U.S. Army Chief of Staff (1983–1987)
 Carl E. Vuono, class of 1957, U.S. Army Chief of Staff (1987–1991)
 Dennis Reimer, class of 1962, U.S. Army Chief of Staff (1995–1999)
 Eric Shinseki, class of 1965, U.S. Army Chief of Staff (1999–2003)
 Martin E. Dempsey, class of 1974, U.S. Army Chief of Staff (2011)
 Raymond T. Odierno, class of 1976, U.S. Army Chief of Staff (2011–2015)
 James C. McConville, class of 1981, US. Army Chief of Staff (2019–present)

Chiefs of the National Guard Bureau / Chiefs of the Militia Bureau 
 Erasmus M. Weaver Jr., class of 1875, 1st Chief of the Militia Bureau (1908-1911)
 Robert K. Evans, class of 1875, 2nd Chief of the Militia Bureau (1911-1912)
 Albert Leopold Mills, class of 1879, 3rd Chief of the Militia Bureau (1912-1916), Medal of Honor recipient in the Spanish-American War (Battle of San Juan Hill)
 George W. McIver, class of 1882, acting Chief of the Militia Bureau (September–October 1916)
 William Abram Mann, class of 1875, 4th Chief of the Militia Bureau (1916-1917)
 Jesse McI. Carter, class of 1886, 5th Chief of the Militia Bureau (1917-1918 and 1919-1921)  
 John W. Heavey, class of 1891, acting Chief of the Militia Bureau (1918-1919)
 Donald W. McGowan, attended 1919-1922, 16th Chief of the National Guard Bureau (1959-1963)
 Raymond F. Rees, class of 1966, acting Chief of the National Guard Bureau (August–September 1994 and 2002-2003)
 Daniel R. Hokanson, class of 1986, 29th Chief of the National Guard Bureau (2020–present)

Air Force Chiefs of Staff 

 Carl Spaatz, class of 1914, 1st USAF Chief of Staff (1947–1948)
 Nathan Farragut Twining, class of 1918, 3rd USAF Chief of Staff (1953–1957)
 Thomas D. White, class of 1920, 4th USAF Chief of Staff (1957–1961)
 John P. McConnell, class of 1932, 6th USAF Chief of Staff (1965–1969)
 John Dale Ryan, class of 1938, 7th USAF Chief of Staff (1969–1973)
 George Scratchley Brown, class of 1941, USAF Chief of Staff (1973–1974)
 Lew Allen, class of 1946, 10th USAF Chief of Staff (1978–1982)
 Charles A. Gabriel, class of 1950, 11th USAF Chief of Staff (1982–1986)
 Michael Dugan, class of 1958, 13th USAF Chief of Staff (1990)

Chief of Staff of non-American armed forces 
 Douglas MacArthur, class of 1903, Field Marshal of the Armed Forces of the Philippines (1935–1946)
 Fidel V. Ramos, class of 1950, Chief of Staff of the Armed Forces of the Philippines (1986–1988)

Presidential and Congressional awardees

Presidential Medal of Freedom recipients 

 Brent Scowcroft, class of 1947, medal awarded in 1991
 Buzz Aldrin
 Michael Collins
 Omar Bradley
 Wesley Clark
 Norman Schwarzkopf Jr.
 Earl Blaik

Congressional Gold Medal recipients 
 Ulysses S. Grant
 John J. Pershing
 Douglas MacArthur
 Matthew Ridgway
 Norman Schwarzkopf Jr.

Congressional Space Medal of Honor recipients 
 Frank Borman
 Ed White

Scientists, inventors, and physicians 
 Benjamin Alvord, class of 1833, mathematician
 Seth Barton, class of 1849 (USA and CSA), chemist
 George Bomford, class of 1805, inventor of ordnance and explosives; standardized army usage as Chief of the Ordnance Department
 John James Abert, class of 1811, head topographer for the U.S. Army; his officers mapped the American West under his supervision
 Benjamin Bonneville, class of 1815, organized expedition that explored the Great Salt Lake, crossed the Sierras, found the headwaters of the Yellowstone and discovered the Humboldt River
 George Washington Whistler, class of 1819, invented contour lines on maps, father of James McNeill Whistler, the artist, husband of "Whistler's Mother"
 Robert Parker Parrott, class of 1824, invented the Parrott rifle used extensively during the American Civil War
 Ormsby M. Mitchel, class of 1825, astronomer
 Henry du Pont, class of 1833, improved the production of gunpowder, chemicals industry pioneer. Father of Henry A. du Pont, class of 1861, and Medal of Honor recipient 
 William W. Averell, class of 1855, inventor of asphalt
 John Wilson Ruckman, class of 1883, inventor of artillery devices critical in World War I
 George O. Squier, class of 1887, developer of Muzak, early radio engineer
 Leslie Groves, class of 1918, chief engineer for the Manhattan Project and the Pentagon
 Edward A. Murphy Jr., class of 1940, credited with the invention of Murphy's Law
 Peter Huybers, class of 1996, MacArthur Foundation Grant awardee ("Genius Grant"), planetary and climate scientist, currently a professor at Harvard
 John T. Thompson, class of 1882, inventor of the Thompson submachine gun
 Edward S. Holden, class of 1870, astronomer, librarian at West Point, 5th president of the University of California, Founder, Lick observatory
 Isaac Newton Lewis, class of 1884, inventor of the Lewis gun

Sportspeople

Television and movie figures 
 James Salter, class of 1945, screenwriter
 Rod Lurie, class of 1984, director, screenwriter
 Mark Valley, class of 1987, actor
 Kelly Perdew, class of 1989, reality show winner, The Apprentice (2004)
 Greg Plitt, class of 2000, fitness supermodel and actor

Eponyms 
 Ambrose Burnside – sideburns
 Edward A. Murphy Jr. – Murphy's Law
 Henry Martyn Robert – Robert's Rules of Order

Places named for graduates

Graduates depicted on currency 
 James B. McPherson, $2 bill, 1890s
 Pierre Gustave Toutant de Beauregard, $20 1863 State of Louisiana, Shreveport
 Joseph K. Mansfield, $500 1873, 1875, 1878, 1880 United States (legal tender) notes
 George Henry Thomas, $5 1890, 1891 Treasury or coin notes
 Jefferson Davis, on Confederate notes
 George Meade, $1,000 1890, 1891 Treasury notes
 Robert E. Lee, on U.S. coins, the 1937 Battle of Antietam Half Dollar Commemorative, and 1925 Stone Mountain Commemorative
 George McClellan, on 1937 Battle of Antietam Half Dollar Commemorative, 10¢ 1863 Searsport Bank, Maine, $1 1862 Chicopee Bank, Mass., $2 1861 Merchants Bank, N.J., $20 1862 Rutland County Bank, Vt.
 Stonewall Jackson, on U.S. coin, the 1925 Stone Mountain Commemorative, $500 17 Feb. 1864, Confederate note
 William T. Sherman, 15¢ fractional currency (proof notes), fourth issue, never circulated
 Winfield Scott Hancock, $2 silver certificates 1880s-90s
 Ulysses S. Grant, class of 1843, on 1922 Grant Memorial Half Dollar and current U.S. $50 bill
 Philip Sheridan, $5 1896 silver certificate (back), $10 1890, 1891 Treasury or coin notes
 Douglas MacArthur, 2500 piso gold, 1980, Philippines
 Dwight D. Eisenhower, $1 coin from 1971 to 1978, and 1990 Eisenhower Centennial Dollar
 Fidel V. Ramos, 2000 piso gold, 1996, Philippines

Graduates depicted on postage stamps 
 Alden Partridge, class of 1806, appears on 11¢ Great Americans series stamp (1985)
 Sylvanus Thayer, class of 1808, appears on 9¢ Great Americans series stamp (1985)
 Jefferson Davis, class of 1828, appears on 6¢ Stone Mountain Memorial commemorative stamp (1970), 32¢ Civil War commemorative stamp (1995) and eight Confederate stamps
 Joseph E. Johnston, class of 1829, appears on 32¢ Civil War commemorative stamp (1995)
 Robert E. Lee, class of 1829, appears on 4¢ Army commemorative stamp (1937), 30¢ Liberty series stamp (1955 and 1957), 6¢ Stone Mountain Memorial stamp (1970), and 32¢ Civil War commemorative stamp (1995)
 Montgomery Blair, class of 1835, appears on 15¢ airmail stamp (1963) and on one Belgian stamp
 William Tecumseh Sherman, class of 1840, appears on 8¢ stamps (1893 and 1895), 3¢ Army commemorative stamp (1937), 32¢ Civil War commemorative stamp (1995), and on stamps from Guam, the Philippines, and Puerto Rico
 Ulysses S. Grant, class of 1843, appears on 5¢ stamps (1890, 1895, 1898), 4¢ stamp (1903), 8¢ stamp (1922), 3¢ Army commemorative stamp (1937), 18¢ Presidential series stamp (1938), 32¢ Civil War commemorative stamp (1995)
 Winfield Scott Hancock, class of 1844, appears on 32¢ Civil War commemorative stamp (1995)
 Stonewall Jackson, class of 1846, appears on 4¢ Army commemorative stamp (1937) and 6¢ Stone Mountain Memorial stamp (1970)
 Phillip Sheridan, class of 1853, appears on 3¢ Army commemorative stamp (1937)
 George Washington Goethals, class of 1880, appears on 3¢ Panama Canal commemorative stamp (1939) and on stamps issued for the Panama Canal Zone
 John J. Pershing, class of 1886, appears on 8¢ Liberty series stamp (1961) and on French stamps
 John L. Hines, class of 1891, appears on 33¢ Distinguished Soldiers commemorative stamp (2000)
 Douglas MacArthur, class of 1903, appears on 6¢ commemorative stamp (1971) and on stamps from Korea and the Philippines
 Joseph Stilwell, class of 1904, appears on 10¢ Distinguished Americans series stamp (2000)
 Henry H. Arnold, class of 1907, appears on 65¢ Great Americans series stamp (1988)
 George S. Patton Jr., class of 1909, appears on 3¢ commemorative stamp (1953) and on stamps from Belgium and Luxembourg.
 Omar Bradley, class of 1915, appears on 33¢ Distinguished Soldiers commemorative stamp (2000)
 Dwight D. Eisenhower, class of 1915, appears on 6¢ commemorative stamp (1969), 6¢ (1970) and 8¢ (1971) Prominent Americans series stamps, and on stamps of other countries
 Frank Borman, class of 1950, appears on ten stamps of Haiti, Hungary, and Senegal
 Fidel V. Ramos, class of 1950, appears on numerous Philippine Stamps since the 1990s
 Buzz Aldrin, class of 1951, appears on foreign stamps

Graduates selected as Time Magazines "Person of the Year" 
 Hugh S. Johnson, class of 1903, Man of the Year – 1933
 Dwight D. Eisenhower, class of 1915, Man of the Year – 1944, 1959
 General William Westmoreland, class of 1936, Man of the Year – 1965
 Col. Frank Borman, Apollo 8, Men of the Year – 1968 (shared honor with U.S. Naval Academy graduates James Lovell and Col. William Anders)

Other 
 Maj. Gen. Samuel Ringgold, class of 1818; the "father of modern artillery"
 Maj. David Moniac, class of 1822
 Gen. Albert Sidney Johnston, class of 1826
 Lt. Gen. Leonidas Polk, class of 1827
 Gen. Jefferson Davis, class of 1828
 Gen. Robert E. Lee, class of 1829
 Maj. Gen. Whitfield Jack, class of 1928
 Gen. Joseph E. Johnston, class of 1829
 Maj. Gen. Francis Henney Smith, class of 1835
 Gen. George Meade, class of 1835
 Maj. Gen. Montgomery C. Meigs, class of 1836
 Gen. Braxton Bragg, class of 1837
 Lt. Gen. Jubal Early, class of 1837
 Maj. Gen. Joseph Hooker, class of 1837
 Gen. Pierre Gustave Toutant (P.G.T.) Beauregard, class of 1838
 Maj. Gen. E.R.S. Canby, class of 1839
 Maj. Gen. Henry Wager Halleck, class of 1839
 Lt. Gen. Richard S. Ewell, class of 1840
 Gen. William Tecumseh Sherman, class of 1840
 Col. Abner Doubleday, class of 1842
 Gen. James Longstreet, class of 1842
 Maj. Gen. William Rosecrans, class of 1842
 Gen. Ulysses S. Grant, class of 1843
 Lt. Gen. and Gov. Simon Bolivar Buckner, class of 1844
 Maj. Gen. Winfield Scott Hancock, class of 1844
 Gen. Stonewall Jackson, class of 1846
 Maj. Gen. George B. McClellan, class of 1846
 Maj. Gen. George Pickett, class of 1846; graduated last in the class
 Maj. Gen. Ambrose Burnside, class of 1847
 Lt. Gen. A. P. Hill, class of 1847
 Maj. Gen. John Buford, class of 1848
 Jerome Napoleon Bonaparte II, class of 1848
 Brig. Gen. Eugene Asa Carr, class of 1850
 Maj. Gen. Alvan Cullem Gillem, class of 1851
 Maj. Gen. George Crook, class of 1852
 Gen. John Bell Hood, class of 1853
 Lt. Gen John Schofield, class of 1853
 Gen. Philip Sheridan, class of 1853
 Maj. Gen. Oliver O. Howard, class of 1854
 Gen. Jeb Stuart, class of 1854
 Gen. George Armstrong Custer, class of June 1861; graduated last in class
 Brig. Gen. William Louis Marshall, class of 1868
 Gen. Tasker H. Bliss, class of 1875
 Brig. Gen. Willard Young class of 1875; first Mormon graduate and son of Brigham Young
 Maj. Gen. Hugh L. Scott, class of 1876
 Henry O. Flipper, class of 1877; first black American graduate
 Maj. Gen. J. Franklin Bell, class of 1878
 Lt. Gen. Hunter Liggett, class of 1879

 George Washington Goethals, class of 1880
 Maj. Gen. John Wilson Ruckman, class of 1883
 General of the Armies John J. Pershing, class of 1886
 General Peyton C. March, class of 1888
 General John L. Hines, class of 1891
 General Charles Pelot Summerall, class of 1892
 Maj. Gen. Fox Conner, class of 1898
 Robert E. Wood, class of 1900
 Thomas Selfridge, class of 1903; the first person to die in a crash of a powered airplane
 Gen. Lesley J. McNair, class of 1904
 Gen. Joseph W. "Vinegar Joe" Stilwell, class of 1904
 Gen. Jonathan Mayhew Wainwright IV, class of 1906

 General of the Air Force Henry "Hap" Arnold, class of 1907
 Lt. Gen. Simon Bolivar Buckner Jr., class of 1908
 Gen. Jacob L. Devers, class of 1909
 Gen. Robert L. Eichelberger, class of 1909
 Gen. George S. Patton, class of 1909
 Lt. Gen. William Hood Simpson, class of 1909
 Gen. Wade H. Haislip, class of 1912
 Lt. Gen. Walton Walker, class of 1912
 Gen. Alexander Patch, class of 1913
 Maj. Gen Junius Wallace Jones, class of 1913
 Brig. Gen. Vicente Lim, class of 1914
 Gen. Brehon B. Somervell, class of 1914
 Gen. Carl Andrew Spaatz, class of 1914
 General of the Army Omar Bradley, class of 1915
 General of the Army Dwight Eisenhower, class of 1915
 Gen. Hubert Harmon, class of 1915
 Gen. Joseph T. McNarney, class of 1915
 Lt. Gen. George E. Stratemeyer, class of 1915
 Gen. James Van Fleet, class of 1915
 Gen. Robert Neyland, class of 1916
 Gen. Mark W. Clark, class of 1917
 Gen. J. Lawton Collins, class of 1917
 Maj. Gen. Norman Cota, class of 1917
 Maj. Gen. Ernest N. Harmon, class of 1917
 Gen. Matthew B. Ridgway, class of 1917
 Maj. Gen. Norman Schwarzkopf Sr., class of 1917
 Gen. Lucius D. Clay, class of June 1918
 Lt. Gen Leslie Groves, class of November 1918
 Gen. Alfred Gruenther, class of 1919
 Gen. Anthony McAuliffe, class of 1919
 Gen. Williston B. Palmer, class of 1919
 Earl Blaik, class of 1920
 Gen. Maxwell D. Taylor, class of 1922
 Col. Mickey Marcus, class of 1924
 Gen. James Edward Moore, class of 1924
 Lt. Gen. James M. Gavin, class of 1929
 Gen. Harold K. Johnson, class of 1933
 Lt. Gen. Leighton I. Davis, class of 1935
 Gen. Creighton Abrams, class of 1936
 Lt. Gen. Benjamin O. Davis Jr., class of 1936
 Gen. William Westmoreland, class of 1936
 Gen. Rafael Ileto, class of 1943
 Gen. Bernard W. Rogers, class of 1943
 Gen. Anastasio Somoza Debayle, class of 1946
 Col. Thomas L. Gatch Jr., class of 1946
 Gov. Warren E. Hearnes, class of 1946
 Lt. Gen. Brent Scowcroft, class of 1947
 Gen. Alexander Haig, class of 1947
 Col. Frank Borman, class of 1950
 Gen. Fidel V. Ramos, class of 1950
 Col. Buzz Aldrin, class of 1951
 Gen. Roscoe Robinson Jr., class of 1951
 Michael Collins, class of 1952
 Lt. Col. Ed White, class of 1952
 Gen. Norman Schwarzkopf Jr., class of 1956
 John Block, class of 1957
 Brig. Gen. Pete Dawkins, class of 1959
 Col. Jim Nicholson, class of 1961
 Maj. James Kimsey, class of 1962
 Gen. George A. Fisher Jr., class of 1964, commander of Multi-National Force – Haiti during Operation Uphold Democracy (1995)
 Gen. Barry McCaffrey, class of 1964
 Gen. Eric K. Shinseki, class of 1965
 Gen. Wesley Clark, class of 1966
 Brig. Gen. Thomas E. White, class of 1967
 Maj. Gen. Albert Madora, class of 1986  
 Capt. Mike Krzyzewski, class of 1969
 Capt. Roy Moore, class of 1969
 Brig. Gen. Patrick Finnegan, class of 1971
 Capt. Jack Reed, class of 1971
 Gen. Richard A. Cody, class of 1972, U.S. Army Vice Chief of Staff (2004-2008)
 Col. William S. McArthur, class of 1973
 Col. Frank E. Weiss, class of 1973
 Gen. Keith B. Alexander, class of 1974
 Gen. Martin Dempsey, class of 1974
 Gen. David Petraeus, class of 1974
 Gen. Walter L. Sharp, class of 1974
 Capt. Louis Caldera, class of 1978
 Gen. John F. Campbell, class of 1979, U.S. Army Vice Chief of Staff (2013-2014)
 José María Figueres, class of 1979
 Col. Robert L. Gordon III, class of 1979
 Gen. Daniel B. Allyn, class of 1981, U.S. Army Vice Chief of Staff (2014-2017)
 Capt. Geoff Davis, class of 1981
 Maj. Gen. Nadja West, class of 1982, the first black Army Surgeon General, the first black female active-duty major general, and the first black female major general in Army medicine
 Gen. Joseph M. Martin, class of 1986, U.S. Army Vice Chief of Staff (2019–2022)
 Maj. Gen. Diana M. Holland, class of 1990; the first female commandant of cadets at West Point; first female deputy commanding general of a light infantry division; first woman promoted to Maj. Gen. in the active component of the Army's engineer branch
 Lt. Gen. Hun Manet, class of 1999; the first Cambodian graduate; Deputy commander-in-chief of the Royal Cambodian Armed Forces, son of Cambodian Prime Minister Hun Sen
 Lt. Dan Choi, class of 2003; founding member and spokesperson of Knights Out, an organization of West Point alumni who support the rights of LGBT soldiers to serve openly
Capt. Alejandro Villanueva, class of 2010; football offensive tackle for the Pittsburgh Steelers in the National Football League
 Lt. Josh McNary, class of 2011; football linebacker for the Indianapolis Colts in the National Football League
 Gen. Randy A. George, class of 1988, U.S. Army Vice Chief of Staff (2022–present)

Non-graduates 

As these alumni did not graduate, their class year represents the year they would have graduated if they had completed their education at the Academy.

References 
General references

Inline citations

External links 
 Notable alumni  from the United States Military Academy
 Famous graduates
 West Pointers on stamps
 History of the Army Olympians
 Mexican War and After from American Military History  a publication of the United States Army Center of Military History
 West Point in the Making of America
 West Point Fact Sheet
 List of Commanders of the Royal Thai Armed Forces Headquarters

 
United States Army officers
Academy alumni, famous list
West Point
West Point